Dino Lucchetta (born 13 March 1968) is an Italian rowing coxswain. He competed at the 1988 Summer Olympics and the 1992 Summer Olympics.

References

1968 births
Living people
Italian male rowers
Olympic rowers of Italy
Rowers at the 1988 Summer Olympics
Rowers at the 1992 Summer Olympics
Sportspeople from Turin
Coxswains (rowing)